Nuclear anxiety, also known as nucleomituphobia, refers to anxiety or even a phobia in the face of a potential future nuclear holocaust, especially during the Cold War and the 2022 Russian invasion of Ukraine.

American anthropologist Margaret Mead viewed such anxiety in the 1960s as a violent survivalist impulse that should instead be channeled toward a recognition of the need for peace. American psychologist Michael D. Newcomb and others defined "nuclear anxiety" in the 1980s post-détente period, Newcomb developing a psychometric to evaluate it with the Nuclear Attitudes Questionnaire (NAQ) in 1986, although mental effects had been at issue since the start of the Atomic Age.

The term originates from the Cold War period and has been defined as a “fear of nuclear war and of its consequences”. It was particularly examined as an issue in child and adolescent psychiatry and much of the research on nuclear anxiety among youth was conducted in the 1980s in many countries. Due to the influence of the particular context under which studies were carried out, replicability is difficult if not impossible to verify. More recent studies regarding nuclear anxiety in the 21st century are relatively scarce.

Causes

Historical context 
The buildup of fear regarding the plausibility of nuclear threat was embedded in the historical and political context of the Cold War. Political events such as the use of nuclear bombs on Hiroshima and Nagasaki in 1945 had proven the destructive power of nuclear weapons, while the Cuban Missile Crisis and Euromissile Crisis contributed to broadcasting to the wider public the increase of tensions between superpowers, and warned of the increasing possibility of resorting to nuclear missiles. Fear of mutually assured destruction stoked nuclear anxiety.

Nuclear anxiety took a greater importance in the political landscape of the United States around the 1984 presidential elections. Two adolescents spoke to Congress of their fears of nuclear war in an event hosted by the United States House Select Committee on Children, Youth and Families on 20 September 1983. The American Orthopsychiatric Association led programmes around nuclear anxiety in children. In addition, Walter Mondale mentioned “nuclear nightmares” experienced by American youth in a speech given during his 1984 election campaign.

Dispute

Fear-mongering by the political left 
The existence of nuclear anxiety experienced by youth in the United States in the Cold War has been challenged by Joseph Adelson and Chester E. Finn, Jr. in their 1985 article Terrorizing Children. They denounce the role of the political left in spreading fear among children for political ends. The authors argue that nuclear anxiety was not prevalent in children before the term was coined, and that surveys measuring nuclear anxiety regularly confronted youth to the thought of nuclear weapons to distil fear. The authors maintain that children are being “terrorized” and “coached” by left-wing politicians to support nuclear disarmament under the pretense of nuclear anxiety.

Role of social class 
It has been argued that wealth, ethnicity and social class have a role in the cause of nuclear anxiety. This claim asserts that wealthy, white children of upper class are more susceptible to suffer from nuclear anxiety as they are exposed to fewer discriminatory or material concerns than children of colour and of lower social class. Those whose attention is diverted to more pressing issues do not have the luxury to be preoccupied by nuclear threats to as great an extent.

Controversy 

Adelson and Finn's Terrorizing Children caused controversy  as the authors disputed the American Psychological Association's reputation following its nuclear anxiety-related programmes, calling it a “fifty-ring circus” led by “luminaries of the Left”, and questioned the credibility of researchers and journals that published evidence of nuclear anxiety among children. This evidence, the authors call “amateurish” and “agitprop, pure and simple”, which has been considered unscientific and unfair criticism.

Both arguments regarding fear-mongering and social conditioning were debated by other researchers who found no correlation between nuclear anxiety, political preferences and social class.

Prevalence during the Cold War 
Nuclear anxiety was prevalent in many parts of the world during the 1980s.  Nuclear threats were identified among northern European students as their biggest concern, as the second or third biggest concern among North American students in 1986, and was a source of anxiety in Third World countries, such as among Colombian youth. It was rated the most frequently mentioned concern among Ontario students in 1985 and Finnish children and teenagers in a national survey in the same year.

Newcomb's Nuclear Attitudes Questionnaire 

Michael D. Newcomb created a Nuclear Attitudes Questionnaire for a study with the aim of assessing 722 young adults’ opinions and fears of nuclear power plants and weapons. The fifteen-item questionnaire uses likert-scale questions to evaluate four constructs: nuclear concern, nuclear support, fear of the future and nuclear denial. Possible responses to each item were “Strongly disagree or disagree”, “Don't know”, and “Agree or strongly agree”.

Impact on mental health 

Nuclear anxiety has been found to have negative effects on mental health on people of all ages, and especially on children and teenagers, and have been found in many countries throughout the world due to the omnipresence of nuclear threats. These impacts typically include feelings of anxiety, helplessness, frequent worrying, stress, hopelessness, loss of meaning or purpose, fear, low life satisfaction, depression, increased drug use, “disturbances in maturational development” among youth, worthlessness, loneliness, alienation, low self-esteem and low subjective wellbeing. Nuclear anxiety also correlated among teenagers with getting into trouble.

Some gender differences have been found with regards to these effects. A study has found that men were less inclined to report anxiety and more inclined to deny the threats of nuclear warfare than women, potentially due to machismo according to the author. Women also reported lower life satisfaction and men higher drug use.

Impacts on mental health also depend on the extent of worry about nuclear threats. While worry to the level of “concern” rarely leads to degradation of mental health, while worry to the level of “despair” has been found to have impacts on mental health that remain stable over time, but that subjects can live with.

Parental denial of the existence of a nuclear threat or of nuclear anxiety worsens its consequences.

Effects on mental health also depended on whether subjects participated in disarmament activism. Those who did not faced bigger anxiety-related issues lasting until at least mid-adulthood, while those who did reported no decrease in mental health.

Impact on activism 

Nuclear anxiety has also had an impact on political activism, notably through peace protests and the nuclear freeze movement. Nuclear anxiety has been correlated with greater opposition to nuclear armament and with the desire to take action about the issue. Those who believe that survival is unlikely or impossible in the advent of a nuclear war are likely to turn to antinuclear activism, seeking to educate others about such threats and protesting to pressure governments to disarm. A greater interest in political processes is likely for those whose nuclear anxiety does not surpass the level of ‘concern’, while despaired individuals may be more likely to support disarmament but withdraw from politics due to distrust towards governments and anti-nationalistic feelings.

Protests such as the nuclear freeze movement have also been shown to likely incite support for disarmament among those experiencing nuclear anxiety.

Treatment 

Treatment of nuclear anxiety mainly revolves around finding a way to live with fear and taking action to limit its nefarious effects on mental health. Preparing food and medical supplies to enhance chances of survival has been correlated with increased optimism, key to reducing anxiety. Discussing fears with peers, family and teachers has also been useful to alleviate anxiety and increase confidence. Activism may be very efficient at reducing nuclear anxiety, as it helps minimise feelings of helplessness and empowers subjects. Mobilisation can greatly reduce adverse effects of nuclear anxiety.

The participation of relatives, especially parents, in disarmament activism has been linked to higher participation of subjects and higher optimism.

Some nuclear anxiety workshops have found success at reducing nuclear anxiety and finding a meaning to life in the nuclear age, especially those practising logotherapy.

One study compiled coping mechanisms used to treat nuclear anxiety as follows: 

On the other hand, denial or avoidance of emotional distress and of activism may prevent recovery.

See also 

 Nuclear proliferation
 Nuclear holocaust
 Eco-anxiety
 Ecological grief
 Psychic numbing
 Doomsday Clock

References 

Psychology
Mental health
Cold War
Nuclear warfare
Anxiety
Applied psychology